Odrzywół  is a village in Przysucha County, Masovian Voivodeship, in east-central Poland. It is the seat of the gmina (administrative district) called Gmina Odrzywół. The village has an approximate population of 1,300.

Odrzywół received town charter in 1418, due to the efforts of the Starosta of Radom, Dobrogost Czarny Odrzywolski (Nalecz coat of arms). King Władysław Jagiełło permitted Odrzywolski to turn the village of Wysokin into the town of Odrzywół because during the Polish–Lithuanian–Teutonic War, he had distinguished himself. Odrzywół remained a small town, which until the Partitions of Poland belonged to the Sandomierz Voivodeship. In 1815 it became part of Russian-controlled Congress Poland, and was stripped of its town charter because of participation of residents in the January Uprising.

Currently Odrzywół is a road hub, with a junction of two roads (Końskie–Warsaw, and Łódź–Radom). The village has a late 18th-century rectory, where in April 1809 Prince Józef Poniatowski stayed. It also has a Neo-Gothic parish church, built in the early 20th century. In 1968, the church was visited by Cardinal Karol Wojtyła.

References

External links
 Jewish Community in Odrzywół on Virtual Shtetl

Villages in Przysucha County
Lesser Poland
Radom Governorate
Łódź Voivodeship (1919–1939)